The Albanian National Lyceum was a high school in the city of Korçë, Albania, fully financed by the Albanian government, but that emphasized the French culture and the European values. The school fully functioned in the years 1917–1939. The building is still used to host the Raqi Qirinxhi High School.

History
The Lyceum opened its doors on 25 October 1917 as the French Lyceum with the decision of the government of the Autonomous Region of Korçë. In 1921 it was renamed to National Lyceum. It was a secular school where all the subjects were in the French language with the exception of the Albanian language.

During World War II, many students of the school joined the youth ranks of the Communist Party of Albania. Following this activity, the fascist regime closed the school. As a result of this decision, which many students found unjust, 150 of them joined the ranks of the  Albanian liberation movement  after a meeting in Voskopoje. Overall, 384 students of the school joined the liberation movement, out of which 54 died while fighting the fascist and Nazi enemies. Three of them have been declared People's Heroes of Albania by the Albanian government for extraordinary acts of bravery. After 1944, the re-opened school was named after former alumnus and teacher Raqi Qirinxhi, People's Teacher of Albania.

The dictator Enver Hoxha was a student here. Under his rule he sent Sabiha Kasimati, a leading scientist who was another fellow student, to be shot in 1951 after she stood against him.

Notable alumni
Pandi Geço
Enver Hoxha
Sabiha Kasimati
Sotir Kuneshka
Misto Treska

See also
Raqi Qirinxhi High School

References

Sources

Secondary schools in Albania
Educational institutions established in 1917
Buildings and structures in Korçë
1917 establishments in Albania
Schools in Korçë